Kaz Hawkins (January 21, 1973) is a Northern Irish blues, folk and soul singer, songwriter signed to Dixiefrog Records in Paris, France.

Early life
Hawkins was born and grew up in Belfast but now lives in France. She enjoyed singing at church, and was influenced by her grandmother singing at home. In her youth, she auditioned for the television show Opportunity Knocks where the musical director told her grandmother to let her listen to Etta James. Her love affair of soul music began here.

Career
Hawkins sang in cover bands for 20 years before she began creating original material.

She has released four studio albums, two EPs (no longer available), one live album (digital only). She has also released a compilation album exclusively on vinyl   Upon signing with Dixiefrog Records, an anthology of her back catalogue called 'My Life And I' was released. A seventeen track CD and double vinyl was released in 2022. A new album is due for release in Spring 2023. 

In 2017, she began presenting a blues show on BBC Radio Ulster, "Kaz Hawkins Got The Blues". produced by Ralph McLean As of 2022, a total of eight series have been recorded by Kaz Hawkins for BBC Radio.

Hawkins was invited to Florence Academy of Art in Alabama, to join in a various artists album Something In The Water to help highlight children not having access to arts in Alabama. The album included one of the original Muscle Shoals Rhythm Section, David Hood and musicians Clayton Ivey and Will McFarlane supporting a line up of international artists covering songs recorded in Alabama.

In April 2022, Hawkins was given the honourable title of Godmother of the oldest blues festival in France. Cahors Blues Festival asked her permission in front of gathered press at the launch of the 40th anniversary of the festival. She accepted the honour of 'Marraine du festival'' and will represent them going forward. She joined Grammy Award winning Christone "Kingfish" Ingram, Popa Chubby and Kirk Fletcher as festival headliners in July 2022, in the town of Cahors, France.

Hawkins has regularly been invited by the Irish composer and Golden Globe nominee Brian Byrne, to perform in Ireland and Los Angeles on his compositions. She joined an international cast including Fra Fee, Joe Rooney, Adele King, as well as a 70-member choir, and the RTÉ Concert Orchestra for the launch of the production Angel of Broadway in Dublin.

Awards
Winner - Best Album for 'My Life And I' - Innocent Award. Berlin, Germany (2022).

NI Music Prize nominee in 2014, 2015, 2016 and 2022

Winner - Northern Ireland Blues Act of the Year - UK Blues Awards (2018).

Winner - European Blues Challenge in Denmark (2017).

Semi-finalist - Blues Foundation International Blues Challenge, Memphis (2017).

Winner - UK Blues Challenge (2016).

Winner - Pure M Magazine Awards - Ireland Best Female and Best Video for "This Is Me" (2016).

Winner - Barry Middleton Memorial Award for Emerging Artist at the British Blues Awards (2015).

Discography

Studio albums
 Get Ready (2014)
 Feelin' Good (2017) - Kaz Hawkins BandFeelin' Good (2017) (US Version)
Feelin' Good (2018) (reissue)
 Don't You Know (2017)

Live albums
 Live at The Park Avenue Feat. Sam York (2018)
Live at La Traverse (digital only) (2020)

Compilation albums
 The Collection on Vinyl (2018)
Memories Of (2020)
My Life And I (2022 Remastered) Dixiefrog Records

Singles
"On This Little Island" (2020) - Mathis & Kaz (Earlybird Records, Germany)

Appears on 
"Shake" (2014) Track 4 on Various – The Best Of 2014 (The blues magazine of Classic Rock later renamed Louder Sound)
"Let it Be" (2015) Track 6 on Simon Murphy - Let it Be
"Won't You Save My Soul" (2019) Single - Eugene De Rastignac
"Something in the Water" (2019) Various Artists - Florence Academy of Fine Arts (FAFA), United States

References

External links
 

1973 births
Living people
Musicians from Belfast
Blues singers from Northern Ireland
Singer-songwriters from Northern Ireland
BBC Radio Ulster presenters
21st-century singers from Northern Ireland
21st-century women singers from Northern Ireland
British women radio presenters